The 1971 Davis Cup was the 60th edition of the Davis Cup, the most important tournament between national teams in men's tennis. 28 teams entered the Europe Zone, 13 teams entered the Americas Zone, and 9 teams entered the Eastern Zone. Bolivia made its first appearance in the tournament.

Brazil defeated Mexico in the Americas Inter-Zonal final, India defeated Japan in the Eastern Inter-Zonal final, and Czechoslovakia and Romania were the winners of the two Europe Zones, defeating Spain and West Germany respectively.

In the Inter-Zonal Zone, Brazil defeated Czechoslovakia and Romania defeated India in the semifinals, and then Romania defeated Brazil in the final. Romania were then defeated by the defending champions the United States in the Challenge Round. The final was played at the Olde Providence Racquet Club in Charlotte, North Carolina, United States on 8–11 October.

1971 was the last year the Davis Cup was played under the Challenge Round format.

South Africa was excluded from the tournament as part of the growing international opposition to its apartheid policies.

Americas Zone

North & Central America Zone

South America Zone

Americas Inter-Zonal Final
Mexico vs. Brazil

Eastern Zone

Zone A

Zone B

Eastern Inter-Zonal Final
Japan vs. India

Europe Zone

Zone A

Zone A Final
Czechoslovakia vs. Spain

Zone B

Zone B Final
Romania vs. West Germany

Inter-Zonal Zone

Draw

Semifinals
India vs. Romania

Brazil vs. Czechoslovakia

Final
Brazil vs. Romania

Challenge Round
United States vs. Romania

References

External links
Davis Cup Official Website

 
Davis Cups by year
Davis Cup
Davis Cup
Davis Cup
Davis Cup
Davis Cup
Davis Cup
Davis Cup
Davis Cup